Wolfsteiner Ohe is a river of Bavaria, Germany. It is formed at the confluence of the Saußbach and the Reschbach west of Freyung. It flows into the Ilz near Fürsteneck.

See also
List of rivers of Bavaria

References

Rivers of Bavaria
Rivers of Germany